Korokoro, a suburb of Lower Hutt City, lies in the south of the North Island of New Zealand. The suburb occupies part of the western hills of the Hutt Valley; its eastern slopes overlook Petone and the Wellington harbour.

Korokoro was established in the 1900s by the  Liberal government (in office 1891–1912), and remained a relatively small settlement until the Lower Hutt City Council developed the area for private housing in the 1960s.. Before 1989, Korokoro formed part of the Petone Borough,
which amalgamated with Lower Hutt City in that year.

Korokoro has a  full primary school established in 1904 called Korokoro School with over 180 pupils attend. The school has eight classrooms and is  decile 10.

Demographics

Korokoro had a population of 1,482 at the 2018 New Zealand census, an increase of 153 people (11.5%) since the 2013 census, and an increase of 198 people (15.4%) since the 2006 census. There were 540 households. There were 744 males and 741 females, giving a sex ratio of 1.0 males per female. The median age was 37.9 years (compared with 37.4 years nationally), with 315 people (21.3%) aged under 15 years, 225 (15.2%) aged 15 to 29, 795 (53.6%) aged 30 to 64, and 147 (9.9%) aged 65 or older.

Ethnicities were 85.6% European/Pākehā, 10.9% Māori, 2.0% Pacific peoples, 10.9% Asian, and 3.0% other ethnicities (totals add to more than 100% since people could identify with multiple ethnicities).

The proportion of people born overseas was 24.3%, compared with 27.1% nationally.

Although some people objected to giving their religion, 58.5% had no religion, 30.2% were Christian, 1.2% were Hindu, 0.4% were Muslim, 0.6% were Buddhist and 2.0% had other religions.

Of those at least 15 years old, 501 (42.9%) people had a bachelor or higher degree, and 87 (7.5%) people had no formal qualifications. The median income was $52,700, compared with $31,800 nationally. The employment status of those at least 15 was that 729 (62.5%) people were employed full-time, 150 (12.9%) were part-time, and 45 (3.9%) were unemployed.

Education

References

Suburbs of Lower Hutt